Annette Flore Ngo Ndom (born 2 June 1985) is a Cameroonian football goalkeeper who currently plays for Slovak Women's First League club FK Union Nové Zámky.

Career

She played for the Cameroon women's national football team at the 2012 London Olympics, her country's first appearance at a major tournament. A report in the Metro newspaper said Ngo Ndom displayed "an aversion to footballs" and was "flapping like a chicken in a disco" during 5–0 and 3–0 defeats by Brazil and Great Britain. She enjoyed more success at club level, saving four penalties and converting one herself in Nové Zámky's 2014 Slovak Women's Cup final win over rivals Slovan Bratislava.

Honours 
Nové Zámky
Winner
 Slovak Women's First League: 2013–14
 Slovak Women's Cup: 2014

Individual
 IFFHS CAF Woman Team of the Decade 2011–2020

References

External links 
 
 
 

1985 births
Living people
Cameroonian women's footballers
Cameroonian expatriate women's footballers
Cameroonian expatriate sportspeople in Slovakia
Expatriate women's footballers in Slovakia
Women's association football goalkeepers
Olympic footballers of Cameroon
Footballers at the 2012 Summer Olympics
2015 FIFA Women's World Cup players
Cameroon women's international footballers
2019 FIFA Women's World Cup players
African Games silver medalists for Cameroon
African Games medalists in football
Competitors at the 2015 African Games
FK Union Nové Zámky players
20th-century Cameroonian women
21st-century Cameroonian women